This is a list of airlines that have an air operator's certificate issued by the civil aviation authority of the Democratic Republic of the Congo, the Autorité de l'Aviation Civile.

Defunct airlines  
This is a list of now defunct airlines from the Democratic Republic of the Congo.

See also 
 List of defunct airlines of the Democratic Republic of the Congo
 List of airlines
 List of air carriers banned in the European Union
 List of companies based in the Democratic Republic of the Congo

References

Airlines
Congo, Democratic Republic of the
Airlines
Congo, Democratic Republic of the